Frieder Birzele (born 17 January 1940) is a German politician from the Social Democratic Party of Germany. He is married and has two children. He studied jurisprudence in Tübingen and Berlin from 1960 till 1965.He served as member of the Landtag of Baden-Württemberg from 1976 to 2006 and was the Minister of the Interior of Baden-Württemberg from 1992 to 1996.

References

1940 births
Living people
People from Göppingen
Social Democratic Party of Germany politicians
Members of the Landtag of Baden-Württemberg
Commanders Crosses of the Order of Merit of the Federal Republic of Germany
Recipients of the Order of Merit of Baden-Württemberg